Mantra is the second album by Norwegian progressive death metal band In Vain. It was released on January 18, 2010 by Indie Recordings. The album was recorded and mixed at the Dub Studio, in Kristiansand, between July 2008 and April 2009. The album was mastered in Strype Audio in May 2009.

The album was met with generally positive reviews and have currently a rating of 4/5 stars on sputnikmusic. There were released at special double disc edition with the bonus track "In Remembrance", which is a re-recorded version of the track first released on the "Wounds" EP in 2005. This album does not feature Even Fuglestad as an official member, but his contributions were credited as guest. Current guitarist Kjetil D. Pedersen was also featured as a guest on this album.

Track listing
From Metal Archives.

Credits

Band members
From Metal Archives.
 Johnar Håland – guitars, acoustic guitar, E-Bow & backing vocals
 Sindre Nedland – lead vocals & backing vocals (except track 3 and "Wayphearing Stranger")
 Andreas Frigstad – lead vocals (except track 3 and "Wayphearing Stranger")
 Stig Reinhardtsen – drums
 Kristian Wikstøl – bass guitar, hardcore vocals (on track 2,5,8,"In Remembrance") & backing vocals

Guest musicians
From Metal Archives.
 Endre Kirkesola – organs, synth pads, chimes
 Kenneth Silden – piano, organs, Hammond B3
 Kjetil D. Pedersen – lead guitars
 Even Fuglestad – guitars (additional)
 Kjetil Nordhus – vocals (tracks 1, 4)
 Jan Kenneth Transeth – vocals (track 3 and on "Wayphearing Stranger")
 Gil Silverbird – introduction voices, drumming, native flutes, chants, clean vocals (track 6)
 Hanne Kolstø – vocals on "Wayphearing Stranger"
 Erik Pedersen – trumpet
 Sebastian Grushot – violin
 Nemanja Markovic – cello

Production
From Metal Archives.
 Endre Kirkesola – producer, engineering, mixing, samples
 Johnar Håland – producer, engineering, mixing, samples
 Tomas Haugland – cover art
 Alexander Benjaminsen – photography
 Mantus – artwork
 Tom Kvålsvoll – mastering

References

In Vain (band) albums
2010 albums